Turismo Nacional (National tourism, lit., national touring) popularly known by its acronym TN, is a touring car racing series based in Argentina that has been active since 1961. It is organized by the Asociación de Pilotos de Automóviles de Turismo and is governed by the Automobile Sports Commission of the Argentine Automobile Club. The cars involved are almost standard preparation cars, that is to say practically a road car prepared for competitions. Originally, only models made in Argentina were allowed (hence the name, that is, nationally manufactured), but after Argentina's entry into Mercosur, Brazilian models were allowed.

Currently, Turismo Nacional is made up of two divisions, which share the calendar but the races run separately. In Class 2, B-segment models with engines up to 1.6-liter displacement are allowed. Class 3 cars are limited to 2.0 liters of displacement; mainly, C-segment models are allowed.

Classes
From its inception, the category organized its competitions, dividing its fleet into classes, for which the size of the vehicle and the displacement of the engines had to be taken into account. Initially, 5 TN classes were organized.

Currently, the category is divided into two distinct divisions. The smaller division is known as Class 2, which is intended for those cars of national production, standard preparation and with a maximum displacement of 1600 cm3. While the largest division is known as Class 3, which admits the same conditions as Class 2, but differing in its displacement, which is allowed up to a ceiling of 2000 cm3.

With the elimination of import restrictions due to the creation of Mercosur, models produced in Brazil were admitted to the category.

Class 2

Models
 Chevrolet Onix
 Chevrolet Classic
 Fiat Palio
 Fiat Argo 
 Ford Fiesta Kinetic
 Renault Clio
 Renault Kwid
 Toyota Etios
 Nissan March
 Peugeot 208
 Volkswagen Gol Trend
 Citroën DS3

Class 3

Models
 Alfa Romeo 147
 Chevrolet Cruze
 Citroën C4 Lounge
 Fiat Tipo
 Ford Focus
 Honda Civic
 Kia Cerato
 Mitsubishi Lancer GT
 Peugeot 408
 Toyota Corolla
 Volkswagen Vento II
 Hyundai Veloster

Champions

Broadcasting rights

Radio

Television  
  Argentina: Telecanal (1996-2011)
  Brazil: GNT (1996-2011) 
  Chile: TVN, Chilevisión, Canal 13, La Red, Metrópolis Intercom, SKY and VTR Cableexpress
  Paraguay: Unicanal (1996-2011)
  Uruguay: VTV (1996-2011)

References

Touring car racing series
Auto racing series in Argentina
1961 establishments in Argentina
Recurring sporting events established in 1961